Manganese(II) phthalocyanine is a compound of manganese and phthalocyanine.

References

Phthalocyanines
Manganese(II) compounds